Zero Album: Utahime 2 (歌姫2) is the cover album by Japanese singer Akina Nakamori. It was released on 20 March 2002 under the Universal Music Japan's sub-label KittyMe. It's Nakamori's second cover album from the Utahime cover album series.

It's also first album to be released under new signed recording label, Universal Japan Music. Instead of debuting with new original album, Nakamori chose hew new start with cover album and put in the beginning of the title Zero.

The album was released in 2-disc, second disc includes instrumental version of the songs arranged by Akira Senju.

On 30 April 2003, the cover song Ruriiro Chikyuu was included as a coupling song of the single Days. It was promoted as an image commercial song to the mobile company au.

Stage performance
On April 2002, Nakamori performed Ruriiro no Chikyuu and Cosmos in the Fuji TV music television program Music Fair 21. In live tour Resonancia in 2002, Nakamori performed on encore the same cover songs.

Chart performance
Zero Album: Utahime 2 debuted at number 10 on the Oricon Album Weekly Chart and charted for 15 weeks and sold over 229,700 copies. It's her first album in 7 years to debut at Top 10 Charts.

Track listing

References

2002 albums
Japanese-language albums
Akina Nakamori albums
Albums produced by Akina Nakamori
Universal Music Japan albums